Un-United Kingdom is an EP released by Pitchshifter in 1999. The EP is dedicated to band's good friend, Ken Owen from Carcass, who suffered a severe intracerebral hemorrhage and spent ten months in a coma before ultimately recovering.

In January 2020, the band announced they were releasing a "redux" of the song, with additional guest vocals, to coincide with the day of Brexit.

Track listing

Personnel
Pitchshifter
 Vocals - J.S. Clayden
 Guitar - Jim Davies 
 Bass - Mark Clayden 
 Drums - Jason Bowld

Production
Artwork by J.S. Clayden and Unknown Graphic Services 
Engineered by Craig Chettle, Greg Marshall, J.S. Clayden and Johnny Carter
Mastered by Tim Young 
Produced, mixed by Pitchshifter 
Written by Pitchshifter (tracks: 1, 2, 4), Big Black (track: 3)

References

1999 EPs
Pitchshifter albums
Alternative Tentacles EPs